Danny Lee is an American film director, producer, and screenwriter from Los Angeles, California.

Career
Danny Lee has directed and produced a variety of work including documentary films, short series and branded content. He is most well known for directing the award-winning docuseries 30 for 30: Friedman’s Shoes for ESPN, about the storied shoe store in Atlanta. In 2005, Lee released his directorial debut at the AFI Fest with Rock Fresh, a candid documentary about graffiti artists taking their subversive art mainstream.

In 2010, Lee created, wrote and directed The Clinic, a Hulu comedy series about a marijuana dispensary. Lee directed Road To Brooklyn, a documentary series executive produced by Jay-Z, which chronicled the story of the Brooklyn Nets relocating from New Jersey to Brooklyn; the series was a 2013 Webby Awards honoree. He directed the documentaries Midnight in Juarez and Skate or Die, the latter of which was inducted into the Smithsonian Institution; he also directed Roll on Rockaway, which was a 2014 Webby Awards honoree. Lee has also directed the Nissan-branded ESPN series With Dad featuring Clay Matthews Jr., which won the 2015 Cynop sis Best Branded Web Series award. His television series, After The Raves, which documents the history of dance music with Tommie Sunshine, is currently airing on Red Bull TV. Lee is working on Public Disturbance, a feature comedy he directed and produced for Lionsgate that stars Mike Tyson, Skyler Samuels, Amber Stevens West, Bobby Lee, Dillon Francis, and The Janoskians.

Lee was featured in Paper Magazine's March 2007 Beautiful People issue. In 2008, the Korean Film Council named Lee the recipient of the Best Project Award, along with a cash grant for his feature film script, Winter War. Lee is the principal of production company Calico.

Filmography

References

External links

Living people
American film directors of Korean descent
Film directors from Los Angeles
Year of birth missing (living people)